Enrique Felipe de Guzmán, 2nd Count-Duke of Olivares was the illegitimate son of Gaspar de Guzmán, Count-Duke of Olivares, who was legitimated in 1642 and who inherited the title of Count-Duke of Olivares.

His mother was his father's mistress, Isabel de Anversa, and he was initially named Julian.  In 1626, Gaspar de Guzmán, Count-Duke of Olivares' daughter, the Marchioness of Heliche, and his favorite nephew both died.  It was widely believed at court that Olivares' heir would be his remaining nephew, Luis de Haro, but in 1642, Olivares decided to legitimize his son, who was consequently re-christened Enrique Felipe de Guzmán.  This decision infuriated the Queen of Spain, Elisabeth of France, who believed that Olivares' precedent led to Philip IV of Spain's decision to legitimize his bastard son, John of Austria the Younger.

He married Juana Fernández de Velasco and together the couple had a son, Gaspar Felipe de Guzmán.

17th-century Spanish nobility
Counts of Olivares
Dukes of Olivares